Mochammad Supriadi (born 23 May 2002) is an Indonesian professional footballer who plays as a winger for Liga 1 club Persebaya Surabaya.

Club career

Persebaya Surabaya
On 21 May 2019, Persebaya Surabaya announced a deal for Supriadi to join Indonesian Liga 1 club Persebaya on a free transfer. At that time, he was 16 years old and he has officially signed a long-term contract. Supriadi made his first-team debut on 24 August 2019 as a substitute in a match against Persija Jakarta. He entered 2 minutes before half time.

Career statistics

Club

Notes

International goals

Indonesia U19

Honours

Club
Persebaya Surabaya
 Liga 1 runner-up: 2019
 East Java Governor Cup: 2020

Persebaya Surabaya U-20
 Elite Pro Academy U-20: 2019

International
Indonesia U-16
 Thien Phong Plastic Cup: 2017
 JENESYS Japan-ASEAN U-16 Youth Football Tournament: 2017
 AFF U-16 Youth Championship: 2018
Indonesia U-19
 AFF U-19 Youth Championship third place: 2019

References

External links
 Mochammad Supriadi at persebaya.id
 

2002 births
Living people
Sportspeople from Surabaya
Sportspeople from East Java
Indonesian footballers
Indonesia youth international footballers
Liga 1 (Indonesia) players
Persebaya Surabaya players
Association football wingers